Rajesh is a given name of Indian and Nepali origin.

Given name
 Rajesh (actor), South Indian actor
 Rajesh (Kannada actor), Kannada actor
 Rajesh Bishnoi, Indian cricketer 
 Rajesh Chauhan, Indian cricketer
 Rajesh Gangwar, Indian social worker
 Rajesh Hamal, Nepali actor
 Rajesh Khanna, North Indian actor and politician
 Rajesh Khattar, Indian television and film actor
 Rajesh Krishnan, Indian actor and playback singer 
 Rajesh Kumar (actor), Indian television actor
 Rajesh Kumar Manjhi, Indian Rashtriya Janata Dal politician
 Rajesh Mirchandani, British news presenter and communications executive
 Rajesh Pilot, Indian politician of the Congress party
 Rajesh Pillai, Indian film director
 Rajesh Roshan, Bollywood music composer
 Rajesh Sharma (disambiguation), several people
 Rajesh Singh, Fijian politician of Indian descent
Rajesh Soosainayagam, Indian footballer known as Rajesh S
 Rajesh Touchriver, Indian film director
 Rajesh Vedprakash, Indian voice artist
 Rajesh Vaidhya, Indian veena player
 Rajesh Vivek, Indian actor

Surname
Aishwarya Rajesh (born 1990), Indian film actress
Aryan Rajesh, Indian film actor
M. Rajesh (born 1975), Indian film director and screenwriter
M. B. Rajesh (born 1971), Indian politician
Monisha Rajesh, British travel writer and journalist
Satyam Rajesh (born 1979), Indian actor
Saundarya Rajesh (born 1968), Indian entrepreneur
U. Rajesh (born 1977), Indian mandolin player, music producer and composer

Fictional characters
Raj Koothrappali, one of the main characters of The Big Bang Theory